The 1947–48 Boston Celtics season was the second season of the Boston Celtics in the Basketball Association of America (BAA/NBA). This was the first season in which the Celtics qualified for the playoffs, where they lost in the BAA Quarterfinals to the Chicago Stags.

Draft picks

Roster

Regular season

Season standings

Record vs. opponents

Game log

Playoffs

|- align="center" bgcolor="ffcccc"
| 1
| March 28
| Chicago
| L 72–79
| Sadowski, Riebe (22)
| Boston Garden
| 0–1
|- align="center" bgcolor="ccffcc"
| 2
| March 31
| Chicago
| W 81–77
| Saul Mariaschin (17)
| Boston Garden
| 1–1
|- align="center" bgcolor="ffcccc"
| 3
| April 2
| Chicago
| L 74–81
| Ed Sadowski (26)
| Boston Garden
| 1–2
|-

Awards and records
Ed Sadowski, All-NBA First Team

Transactions

Trades

Free agency

Additions

Subtractions

References

Boston Celtics seasons
Boston Celtics
Boston Celtics
Boston Celtics
1940s in Boston